Eric Henry Laakso (November 29, 1956December 25, 2010) was an NFL offensive tackle and guard who played seven seasons with the Miami Dolphins, a tenure which included two Super Bowls. After high school at Killingly in Danielson, CT he attended Tulane University, where he majored in civil engineering and played offensive tackle from 1975 to 1977 and was honored as the 1976–77 Tulane Athlete of the year. Laakso was selected 106th overall by the Dolphins in the fourth round of the 1978 NFL Draft. Laakso resided in South Florida and was active with NFL Alumni functions.

According to The Sun-Sentinel, Laakso was found dead in his home in Pompano Beach on Christmas night. The death was attributed to natural causes, Laakso battled heart disease.

Career highlights
 Tulane Offensive Tackle 1975–77
 1976–77 Tulane Athlete of the year
 4th round Draft Pick 106th overall, 1978, Miami
 Miami Dolphins(#68) Offensive Tackle 1978–1984
 Super Bowl XVII (1982)
 Super Bowl XIX (1984)

See also
 List of retired professional American football players
 Miami Dolphins
 Miami Dolphins seasons

External links

1956 births
2010 deaths
American football offensive tackles
Tulane Green Wave football players
Tulane University alumni
Miami Dolphins players